Amherst Internment Camp was an internment camp that existed from 1914 to 1919 in Amherst, Nova Scotia. It was the largest internment camp in Canada during World War I; a maximum of 853 prisoners were housed at one time at the old Malleable Iron foundry on the corner of Hickman and Park Streets. The most famous prisoner at the camp was Leon Trotsky. There was a commemoration of the guards and prisoners for the 100th anniversary of the closing of the Amherst Internment Camp on July 2, 2019, at the Amherst Armoury.

Background

When the First World War began in 1914, there was widespread suspicion in Canada that immigrants from enemy nations might be disloyal. In response, the federal government passed regulations allowing it to monitor and intern anyone who had not become naturalized British subjects. These people were labelled "enemy aliens."   In total 8,579 men were prisoners of war in 24 camps across the country.

The Amherst camp was one of three internment camps in Nova Scotia. The others were on Melville Island in the Northwest Arm of Halifax Harbour and in Citadel Hill (Fort George). Unlike the rest of Canada, where internees were mostly of Eastern European origin, the internees in Nova Scotia were mainly German reservists.

Camp

The camp consisted of a building that was 100 feet wide by a quarter of a mile long. The south end was used as the German Officers' quarters, the camp hospital and the medical inspection room. The north end housed the prisoners' quarters and their washrooms. Further to the north, close to Patterson Street, was the large mess hall, recreation room, kitchen, and pantry stores. Of these eight hundred prisoners, about five hundred were sailors from German warships sunk by the Royal Navy; about two hundred were workers caught by the war in Canada, and a hundred more were officers and wealthy civilian prisoners.

By April 1915, the Halifax camp had become overcrowded and a new one opened at Amherst. The first prisoners of the camp arrived from Halifax on April 17, 1915, aboard armed trains. A total of 640 sailors of the captured vessel . The Citadel now housed only first-class prisoners of war (officers) and Amherst housed those considered second-class (reservists from the ranks and enemy aliens). When the Citadel camp closed on October 3, 1916, its prisoners were transferred to Amherst. At one point toward the end of the war, the Amherst camp held 854 internees and was the largest in Canada.

On June 25, 1915, a group of prisoners refused to enter the compound upon a guard's order. The riot that ensued resulted in one guard being injured and one prisoner was shot and killed and four others were wounded. An inquiry found that discipline had been lacking and the camp commander, Major G. R. Oulton, a veteran of the Second Boer War, was replaced by Colonel .

Trotsky and his family were living in exile in New York City during World War I and decided in 1917 he wanted to return to Russia. His return ship, temporarily docked in the Halifax Harbour. On April 3, 1917, Trotsky was detained at the Citadel, and shortly thereafter was brought to the Amherst Internment Camp (Trotsky's wife, Natalia Sedova, and his children remained in Halifax at a hotel, reporting daily to the police station). Trotsky referred to the camp as a concentration camp.

He wrote about the camp commanders' attempts to block his mobilization of the other prisoners to join the Russian Revolution, writing:

The whole month I was there was like one continuous mass meeting.  I told the prisoners about the Russian revolution, about Liebknecht, about Lenin... the British colonel... forbade me to make any more public speeches.  But this did not happen until the last few days of our stay at the camp, and served only to cement my friendship with the sailors and workers, who responded to the colonel's order by a written protest bearing five hundred and thirty signatures.  A plebiscite like this, carried out in the very face of Sergeant Olsen's heavy-handed supervision, was more than ample compensation for all the hardships of the Amherst imprisonment.

During the four years of the camp, six prisoners successfully escaped while approximately eleven others had died during their internment because of accident, or ill health. A tombstone, located at the Amherst Cemetery, marks the death of these POWs. Their bodies were returned to Germany in 1919. The camp closed on September 27, 1919.

References

External links
 Leon Trotsky - Amherst Internment Camp
 Trotsky in Amherst - Silver Donald Cameron
 Amherst Camp - Museum
 CBC report - Trotsky

Amherst, Nova Scotia
Military history of Nova Scotia
World War I internment camps
World War I prisoner-of-war camps
Buildings and structures in Nova Scotia
1914 establishments in Canada
1919 disestablishments in Canada
Prisoner-of-war camps in Canada
Internment camps in Canada